Momići is a village in the Kula Norinska municipality

Demographics

Church of Our Lady of Fatima 

The 12x12 metre church started construction in 1973 during the time of pastor Špirko Vuković, and it was completed in 1982 during the time of pastor Joza Varvodić. It was blessed by bishop Marko Perić on the holiday of Our Lady of Fatima, on 13 May. Above the altar is the painting Igra križa, sunca i zvijezda(The play of the cross, Sun and stars) by pastor Ivan Marijan Čagalj. When Stjepan Barišić was pastor, in 1995, a belfry was built.

Culture 
On 7 May 1939 a Croatian reference library was opened by the leader of HSS in Metković, dr. Niko Bjelovučić. It stopped working during the Second World War, and its inventory has been lost.

Notes

References

External links

Populated places in Dubrovnik-Neretva County